Andasibe (also Andasibe Gara) is a rural municipality in Madagascar. It belongs to the district of Moramanga, which is a part of Alaotra-Mangoro Region. The population of the commune was estimated to be approximately 13493 in 2006.

Geography
The town lies along the RN 2 at 140 km from Antananarivo, 26 km from Moramanga and 200 km from Toamasina.
It is a railway station on the Antananarivo – East Coast line.

Economy
The nearby national parks offer many job creations in the town.
It is also a site of industrial-scale mining. Sixty-percent of the commune's population is farmers. The most important crop is rice, while other important products are corn, bananas and manioc. Industry and services provide both employment for 20% of the population.

Primary and junior-level secondary education are available in town.

Religion
 FJKM - Fiangonan'i Jesoa Kristy eto Madagasikara (Church of Jesus Christ in Madagascar)
 Roman catholic church

Rivers
The town is crossed by the Sahatandra and Vohitra rivers.

See also
 Analamazaotra National Park
 Andasibe-Mantadia National Park
 Railway stations in Madagascar

References and notes

Populated places in Alaotra-Mangoro